The 1918 Davidson Wildcats football team was an American football team that represented the Davidson College as a member of the South Atlantic Intercollegiate Athletic Association (SAIAA) during the 1918 college football season. In their fourth year under head coach Bill Fetzer, the team compiled a 2–1–1 record.

Schedule

References

Davidson Wildcats
Davidson Wildcats football seasons
Davidson Wildcats football